The Medal of Honor was created during the American Civil War and is the highest military decoration presented by the United States government to a member of its armed forces. The recipient must have distinguished themselves at the risk of their own life above and beyond the call of duty in action against an enemy of the United States. Due to the nature of this medal, it is commonly presented posthumously.

Although Medals of Honor can be awarded only to members of the U.S. armed forces, being a U.S. citizen is not a prerequisite for eligibility to receive the medal. Since the American Civil War, hundreds of people born outside the United States have received the medal, the most recent of these recipients being Pedro Cano and Jesus S. Duran who received their medals in March 2014 for actions performed during World War II and the Vietnam War respectively. The large number of foreign-born recipients during the 19th and early 20th centuries was mostly due to immigration waves from Europe.

American Civil War (A-M)

American Civil War (N-Z)

Indian Wars

Korean Expedition

Spanish–American War

Samoan Civil War

Philippine–American War

Boxer Rebellion

Occupation of Veracruz

World War I

World War II

Korean War

Vietnam War

Afghanistan War

Peacetime

Unknown Soldiers
In addition to the named receipients, the United States Congress has on a few occasions passed special legislation to award the Medal of Honor to Unknown Soldiers of allied foreign nations.

References

External links
Medal of Honor citations
Immigrant Medal of Honor recipients
Irish-born Medal of Honor recipients

Foreign-born